Kargulu may refer to:
Qarğılı, Azerbaijan
Qarqulu, Azerbaijan